Meet Me at the Altar (stylized as Meet Me @ the Altar) is an American pop punk band formed in 2015. Initially, the three members—all of whom lived in different states at the time—worked on music remotely through the internet. The band went on their first tour in 2018, and were signed by Fueled by Ramen in 2020.

History
Meet Me at the Altar was formed in 2015 when Téa Campbell met Ada Juarez through YouTube; the latter had posted a number of videos covering pop punk songs, and Campbell subsequently reached out. In time, the two developed a friendship that turned into the band. To locate a vocalist, Campbell and Juarez held auditions online. Edith Victoria was one of the individuals who tried out for the position, submitting a rendition of Paramore's "All I Wanted." The name of the band refers to a text conversation between Campbell and Victoria, as Billboard notes: "The [name] stems from a text message Juarez sent Victoria in a bonding moment: 'I was like "marry me!"' says Campbell, 'and she typed, "meet me @ the altar."'"

In 2020, the band went viral, partially in part of receiving public endorsements of pop punk veterans Alex Gaskarth of All Time Low and Dan Campbell of The Wonder Years. In October 2020, the band was subsequently signed to Fueled by Ramen. After re-releasing "Garden" under Fueled By Ramen, they released their first new single under the label, "Hit Like a Girl", in March 2021. Their debut EP for the label, Model Citizen, released on August 13, 2021.

In 2022 the band performed at several large venues such as Lollapalooza and TwitchCon, as well as opening for Green Day. In January 2023, they made their television debut on The Late Show with Stephen Colbert, during which they announced their debut album, Past // Present // Future, which was released on March 10, and performed its lead single, "Say It (To My Face)."

Musical style
The band's musical style is commonly described as pop punk. Some publications have compared their musical style to another female-fronted pop punk band, Paramore.

Band members 

Current members
 Edith Victoria – vocals (2017–present)
 Téa Campbell – guitar, bass (2015–present)
 Ada Juarez – drums (2015–present)

Touring members
 El Xiques – bass (2018–present)
 Kaylie Sang – rhythm guitar (2019–present)

Discography

Studio albums

Extended plays

Singles

References

American pop punk groups
Fueled by Ramen artists
Musical groups established in 2015
American musical trios
2015 establishments in the United States
Female-fronted musical groups